Petro Lytvyn is a Ukrainian commanding officer, Lieutenant General. Since 2012 he has been a commander of the 8th Army Corps.

In 1990 Lytvyn graduated the Kiev Armor-Engineer College. He served at the Soviet Far Eastern Military District and Carpathian Military District.

In 2001 Lytvyn graduated the Tactical operations faculty of National University of Defense of Ukraine. He served at the Ukrainian Northern and Western Operational Commands.

In 2008 Lytvyn graduated the Strategic operations faculty of National University of Defense of Ukraine. In 2007-2012 he was a troop commander of the Southern Operational Command.

On August 25, 2012, in Novohrad-Volynskyi Petro Lytvyn attacked activists of "Vidsich" who were distributing leaflets in the "Revenge for division of Ukraine" campaign.

During the War in Donbass, Lytvyn was placed in charge of the Sector D which was completely destroyed on August 24, 2014, and lead to the tragic events of battle of Ilovaisk. According to witnesses, Lytvyn left his troops and fled the battlefield on 25 August.

References

1967 births
Living people
People from Zhytomyr Oblast
Ivan Chernyakhovsky National Defense University of Ukraine alumni
Lieutenant generals of Ukraine
Recipients of the Order of Merit (Ukraine), 3rd class
Recipients of the Order of Merit (Ukraine), 2nd class
Ukrainian diplomats